"So Round, So Firm, So Fully Packed" is a 1947 song by Merle Travis, written by Travis, Eddie Kirk, and Cliffie Stone.

Background
The song describes a woman through the use of advertising slogans. The slogan "So round, so firm, so fully packed, so free and easy on the draw" was used in the Lucky Strike brand cigarette advertising of the time, first heard in 1944 on the Jack Benny and Your Hit Parade radio programs. "I'd walk a mile" is a slogan for Camel cigarettes. "Just ask the man who owns one" refers to Packard automobiles. "She's got the pause that's so refreshing" is a reference to the Coca-Cola slogan "The Pause that Refreshes".

Chart performance
The song was Travis' second number one on the Folk Juke Box charts, where it stayed at number one for 14 weeks and a total of 21 weeks on the chart.

Cover Versions
In 1947 it was also a  #3 hit for Johnny Bond, and a #5 hit for Ernest Tubb.
Eddy Arnold covered the song on his 1954 album Eddy Arnold: An American Institution and his 1956 album A Dozen Hits.
Ricky Skaggs covered the song on his 1981 album Waitin' for the Sun to Shine.

References

 
 

1946 songs
1947 singles
Merle Travis songs
Johnny Bond songs
Songs written by Merle Travis
Songs written by Cliffie Stone